The Hook Ladies Open was a women's professional golf tournament on the Swedish Golf Tour played between 1986 and 1998. It was always held at the Hook Golf Club in Hok, Sweden.

Winners

References

Swedish Golf Tour (women) events
Golf tournaments in Sweden
Defunct sports competitions in Sweden
Recurring sporting events established in 1986
Recurring sporting events disestablished in 1998